Queen Maud Gulf lies between the northern coast of the mainland and the southeastern corner of Victoria Island in Nunavut, Canada. At its western end lies Cambridge Bay, leading to Dease Strait; to the east lies Simpson Strait; and to the north, Victoria Strait. It is home to the Queen Maud Gulf Migratory Bird Sanctuary.

History
In 1839, it was crossed by Peter Warren Dease and Thomas Simpson. It was named by the Norwegian explorer Roald Amundsen in 1905 for the Norwegian queen Maud of Wales.

The wreck lies at the bottom of the eastern portion of Queen Maud Gulf, west of O'Reilly Island.

Islands 
Islands in the Queen Maud Gulf include:

 Jenny Lind Island
 King William Island
 Royal Geographical Society Island

References

Gulfs of Kitikmeot Region
Victoria Island (Canada)
Ramsar sites in Kitikmeot Region